Magallania is an academic journal published by the University of Magallanes. It publishes articles on social sciences and humanities regarding Patagonia, Tierra del Fuego, and Antarctica. The journal was published annually from its establishment in 1970 until 2005 when it began to be issued twice a year.

Spanish-language journals
Biannual journals
Academic journals published by universities of Chile
Magallanes Region
Publications established in 1970
1970 establishments in Chile
Latin American studies journals
Open access journals